A sołtys is a historical Polish title corresponding to that of elder, e.g., of a village.

Soltys may also refer to:

Šoltys, a Czech and Slovak surname
Sołtys (surname)
Sołtys (video game)

See also